Following is a list of architects from the country of Spain.

A–M

Vicente Acero (c.1675/1680–1739)
Martín de Aldehuela (1729–1802)
Martín de Andújar Cantos (born 1602) 
Juan Bautista Antonelli (1550–1616)
Claudio de Arciniega (c. 1520–1593) 
Juan Martín Cermeño (1700-1773)
Alberto Campo Baeza (born 1946)
Jerónimo Balbás (18th century)
José Banús
Francisco Becerra (c. 1545–1605) 
Francesc Berenguer i Mestres (1866–1914)
Alonso Berruguete (1488–1561)
Ricardo Bofill (1939–2022)
Jaume Busquets (1904–1968)
Santiago Calatrava (born 1951)
Nerea Calvillo (born 1973)
Félix Candela (1910–1997)
Alonzo Cano (1601–1667)
Jerónimo Cuervo González (1838–1898)
Antoni Bonet Castellana 
José Benito de Churriguera (1665–1725)
Josep Antoni Coderch (1913–1984)
Simón de Colonia (died 1511)
Alonso de Covarrubias 
Francisco de Cubas 
Josep Domènech i Estapà (1858–1917)
Lluís Domènech i Montaner (1850–1923)
Rita Fernández Queimadelos (1911–2008)
Damián Forment (1480–1540)
Justo Gallego Martínez (1925–2021)
Luis de Garrido (born 1960)
Antoni Gaudí (1852–1926)
Rodrigo Gil de Hontañón (1500–1577)
Juan Gil de Hontañón (1480–1526)
Bernardo Giner de los Ríos (1888–1970) 
Juan Gómez de Mora (1586–1648) 
Vicente Guallart
Juan Guas (c. 1430–1433–c. 1496)
Rafael Guastavino (famous in United States)
Juan de Herrera (1530–1593)
Francisco Herrera the Younger (1622–1655)
Fernando Higueras (1930–2008)
Andrés Jaque (born 1971)
Josep Maria Jujol (1879–1949)
Pedro Machuca (c. 1490–1550)
Manuel Martin Madrid (born 1938)
César Manrique (1919–1992)
Joan Margarit i Consarnau
Jaime Marquet (1710–1782)
Cèsar Martinell i Brunet
Enric Miralles (1955–2000)
Rafael Moneo (born 1937)
Adolfo Moran (born 1953)
Luis Moreno Mansilla (1959–2012)
Berenguer de Montagut
Carlos Morales Quintana

N–Z

Enrique Nieto
Justo Antonio de Olaguibel
Alberto Palacio
Antonio Palacios (1874–1945)
Liliana Palaia Pérez (born 1951)
Carme Pinós
Isidre Puig Boada
Josep Puig i Cadafalch
Salvador Valeri i Pupurull
Diego de Riaño
Pedro de Ribera
Ventura Rodríguez
Maria Rubert de Ventós (born 1956)
Francisco Javier Sáenz de Oiza (1918–2000)
Enric Sagnier
Josep Lluís Sert (1902–1983)
Diego Siloe
Alejandro de la Sota (1913–1996)
Luis Gutiérrez Soto (1890–1977)
Tioda
Juan Bautista de Toledo
Manuel Tolsá
Narciso Tomé
Eduardo Torroja
Emilio Tuñón
Òscar Tusquets
Andrés de Vandelvira
Lorenzo Vázquez de Segovia
Luis de Vega
Luis Vidal
Juan Bautista Villalpando
Juan de Villanueva
Alejandro Zaera (born 1963)
Secundino Zuazo (1887–1971)

See also

 Architecture of Spain
 List of architects
 List of Spaniards

Spain
Architects